Bibi Dalair Kaur was a seventeenth-century Sikh woman who fought against the Moghuls. She rallied 100 female Sikhs against them. She was killed and is considered to be a martyr among Sikhs.

Sources
"Bibi Dalair Kaur" from Allaboutsikhs.com, URL accessed 12/01/06

Year of birth missing
Year of death missing
Female Sikh warriors
Sikh martyrs
Women in 17th-century warfare
Punjabi people
17th-century Indian women
17th-century Indian people